The 1987 Czechoslovak motorcycle Grand Prix was the eleventh round of the 1987 Grand Prix motorcycle racing season. It took place on the weekend of 22–23 August 1987 at the Masaryk Circuit located in Brno, Czechoslovakia.

Classification

500 cc

References

Czech Republic motorcycle Grand Prix
Czechoslovak
Motorcycle Grand Prix